Alejandro "Álex" Blanco Sánchez (born 16 December 1998) is a Spanish professional footballer who plays as a winger for Italian club Como.

Club career
Born in Benidorm, Alicante, Valencian Community, Blanco joined FC Barcelona's youth setup in 2014, from Valencia CF. On 22 July 2016, he returned to the Che, being assigned to the Juvenil A squad.

Blanco made his senior debut with the reserves on 16 September 2017, coming on as a second-half substitute in a 3–2 Segunda División B away win against Atlético Saguntino. He scored his first goal on 9 December, netting the equalizer in a 1–1 draw at CE Sabadell FC.

On 18 January 2018, Blanco renewed his contract with Valencia until 2020. On 4 February, he scored a brace in a 4–1 home routing of Saguntino.

Blanco made his first team debut on 30 October 2018, replacing fellow youth graduate Lee Kang-in in a 2–1 away defeat of CD Ebro, for the season's Copa del Rey. On 31 January 2019, Blanco was loaned to fellow La Liga side Deportivo Alavés, until June.

Blanco made his top tier debut on 3 February 2019, replacing Jonathan Calleri in a 3–0 loss at Real Madrid. However, he only appeared in one further match before returning to his parent club.

On 9 July 2019, Blanco extended his contract with the Che until 2021 and joined Real Zaragoza on loan for the season. He scored his first professional goal the following 21 January, netting the opener in a 3–1 home win against RCD Mallorca for the national cup.

On 29 September 2020, Blanco started Valencia's opening game of the 2020–21 La Liga season away to Real Sociedad, in a 1–0 win. He scored his first goal in the top tier on 21 March of the following year, netting his team's second in a 2–1 home success over Granada CF.

On 18 January 2022, he signed a contract with Italian Serie B club Como until the end of the 2023–24 season.

Personal life
Blanco's father Tito was also a footballer. A midfielder, he also represented Barcelona. He is currently dating Spanish influencer Lidia Rauet

Career statistics

Club

Honours
Valencia
Copa del Rey: 2018–19

References

External links

1998 births
Living people
People from Benidorm
Sportspeople from the Province of Alicante
Spanish footballers
Footballers from the Valencian Community
Association football wingers
Spain youth international footballers
La Liga players
Segunda División players
Segunda División B players
Serie B players
Valencia CF Mestalla footballers
Valencia CF players
Deportivo Alavés players
Real Zaragoza players
Como 1907 players
Spanish expatriate footballers
Expatriate footballers in Italy
Spanish expatriate sportspeople in Italy